Haigwai is an Oceanic language of Milne Bay Province, Papua New Guinea.

References

Nuclear Papuan Tip languages
Languages of Milne Bay Province